The Ticino League is a regionalist, national-conservative political party in Switzerland active in the canton of Ticino.

The party was founded in 1991 by entrepreneur Giuliano Bignasca and journalist Flavio Maspoli. After some public campaigning in the Sunday newspaper  against political power and use of public money, Bignasca and Maspoli founded the Ticino League to continue the fight at the political level. Bignasca (1945–2013) was the League's "president for life".

The League is one of four major parties in the canton, alongside the Liberal Radical Party (PLR), the Democratic People's Party (PPD), and the Swiss Socialist Party (PS). Since 1991, the party has been represented in the National Council and in the five-member cantonal executive of Ticino (the Council of State, Consiglio di Stato) with two seats. In the 90-seat Ticino legislature, (the Grand Council, Gran Consiglio) the party has 18 seats.

At the 2011 federal election, the party won 0.8% of the national popular vote and secured 2 out of 200 seats in the National Council (the first chamber of the Swiss parliament), doubling their representation compared to the single seat they held in 2007 with 0.5% of the vote. In the 2015 election, the Ticino League slightly increased their share of the national vote to 1.0% and kept their two seats in parliament. The party is not represented in the Council of States nor on the Federal Council.

The 2019 Swiss federal election cost the League one of its representatives in the National Council as Roberta Pantani was unable to hold her seat. Lorenzo Quadri was re-elected as the League’s sole representative in the Parliament.

Ideology
In the Federal Assembly, the League sits with the Swiss People's Party (UDC) and commentators see it as the Swiss Italian equivalent of the UDC (although the UDC does still have some seats in the Ticino legislature as well). A more notable political position of the League is its support for banning the Burqa, which it achieved in 2015. 

The League defines itself as neither a left or a right-wing party but is generally characterised as right-wing populist. It is also strongly eurosceptic, supporting Swiss sovereignty and reduced immigration. It also argues for the protection of Swiss and Ticino national identity, wants a more friendly environment for small businesses and policies to protect the elderly and more vulnerable members of society.

Although ideologically close to the UDC, the League has taken a more moderate posture on gay rights and voted in favour of the Marriage For All bill which open the process for legalization of same-sex marriage in Switzerland. The party took a neutral stance during the 2021 Swiss same-sex marriage referendum.

The League supports continued Ticino membership in Switzerland. However, it supports the project of Insubria, and it has some ties with the regional and federalist northern Italian rightist party Lega Nord.

Literature

See also
 Marco Borradori

Notes

References

External links
Official website (in Italian)

Political parties established in 1991
Regionalist parties
Right-wing populism in Switzerland
Conservative parties in Switzerland
Eurosceptic parties in Switzerland
1991 establishments in Switzerland
National conservative parties
Right-wing populist parties
Anti-immigration politics in Europe